Elguja Grigalashvili (born 30 December 1989), is a Georgian footballer, who plays as a playmaking midfielder for Navbahor.

Born in the Georgian capital Tbilisi, his first professional club was FC Dinamo Batumi. He first came to international prominence with his performances for the Georgian national team against Kazakhstan in 2013.

He is the younger brother of Shota, also footballer.

Style of play
Elguja Grigalashvili's position is as a playmaking midfielder, typically playing further forward than the rest of the midfield. The main aim of the role is to create goalscoring chances, suiting a creative player like Elguja Grigalashvili. Dribbling ability was generally viewed as one of Elguja's strongest attributes and his jinking runs with the ball resulted in some spectacular goals. Set piece ability is another of Elguja's strengths; he regularly takes corners and free kicks.

Honours

Club
AGMK
Uzbekistan Cup (1): 2019 (runner-up)
Uzbekistan League Cup (1): 2019 (runner-up)
Chikhura
Georgian Cup (1): 2013-2014 (runner-up)
Georgian Super Cup (1):  2013–2014 (runner-up)

References

External links
 

1989 births
Living people
Footballers from Georgia (country)
Association football midfielders
Georgia (country) international footballers
Expatriate footballers from Georgia (country)
Erovnuli Liga players
Cypriot First Division players
Uzbekistan Super League players
FC Dinamo Batumi players
FC Merani Martvili players
FC Torpedo Kutaisi players
FC Dinamo Tbilisi players
FC Chikhura Sachkhere players
Othellos Athienou F.C. players
Pafos FC players
Ethnikos Achna FC players
FC AGMK players
Expatriate footballers in Cyprus
Expatriate footballers in Uzbekistan